The New Right (Nea Dexia) is a national conservative and far-right political party in Greece. The party was formed in May 2016 by Failos Kranidiotis, a lawyer and former advisor to former Prime Minister Antonis Samaras, after Kranidiotis was ousted from the New Democracy party. In May 2022, the party announced a new coalition formed with Recreate Greece, and named National Creation.

History 
Failos Kranidiotis, a lawyer and former advisor to ex-Prime Minister Antonis Samaras, founded the new party in May 2016, shortly after he was ousted from the conservative New Democracy party, by leader Kyriakos Mitsotakis over controversial online comments.

In June 2016, Kranidiotis announced the party's National Council (presidium).

The New Right has been a member of the Movement for a Europe of Nations and Freedom since 2018.

Election results

European Parliament

References

External links
 

Conservative parties in Greece
Eurosceptic parties in Greece
Nationalist parties in Greece
Political parties established in 2016
National conservative parties
Right-wing populist parties
Member parties of the Identity and Democracy Party